The Permanent Indus Commission (PIC) is a bilateral commission consisting of officials from India and Pakistan, created to implement and manage the goals and objectives and outlines of the Indus Waters Treaty (IWT).

Indus Waters Treaty
After prolonged talks between the governments of India and Pakistan, the IWT was signed in September 1960 with World Bank standing guarantee for any dispute resolution. Broadly, according to this treaty, waters of the three western rivers (the Jhelum, the Chenab, and the Indus itself) were allocated to Pakistan, and those of the three eastern rivers (the Ravi, the Beas, and the Sutlej) were allocated to India. All these six rivers together called as Indus System of Rivers (ISR). PIC is the channel of correspondence between the two countries for the purpose of IWT and first step for conflict resolution. If an agreement cannot be reached at the PIC level, the dispute can be referred to a Neutral Expert for the differences already identified in the treaty or referred to the two governments for approaching the Permanent Court of Arbitration (PCA). If the governments too fail to reach an agreement, the Treaty provides an arbitration mechanism. Presently, the role of the World Bank is limited as provided in Annexues F & G.

The Court of Arbitration has the authority to give a stay order, while the Neutral Expert does not have such powers.

Commissioner of Pakistan has its web page and some related documents are uploaded to disseminate information to the interested readers. Whereas Commissioner of India does not maintain a web site. However both Commissioners do not make the annual reports accessible online to public to keep the public depend on concocted / vested news.

Treaty implementation
Since the ratification of the treaty in 1960 , India and Pakistan have not engaged in any water wars. Most differences and disputes have been settled via legal procedures, provided for within the framework of the treaty. The treaty is considered to be one of the most successful water sharing endeavors in the world despite two wars and many war like situations between the two countries.

Salal dam was constructed after entering mutual agreement by both countries. Tulbul Project is pending for clearance for decades even after protracted discussions between India and Pakistan.  Neutral Expert's ruling was followed for clearing the Baglihar power plant and PCA verdict was followed for clearing the Kishanganga Hydroelectric Plant. Pakistan is claiming violation of the treaty regarding 850 MW Ratle Hydroelectric Plant. India has not yet raised any violation of  IWT by Pakistan.

Meetings 
It was 116th annual meeting on March 23-24,2021, in New Delhi, of the Permanent Indus Commission (PIC), composed of Indus Commissioners of India and Pakistan.

See also
 International arbitration
 International Court of Justice
 International Court of Arbitration

References

India–Pakistan relations
Indus basin
Water conflicts
Water management authorities in India
Water supply and sanitation in Pakistan
Pakistani commissions and inquiries